Christian Bär (born 17 September 1962 in Kaiserslautern) is a German mathematician, whose research concerns differential geometry and mathematical physics.

Bär enrolled on Ph.D. studies at the University of Bonn as a student of Hans Werner Ballmann, and obtained his Ph.D in 1990.

He was elected president of the German Mathematical Society, having assumed the post in 2011.

Selected papers

References

External links
Author profile in the database zbMATH 
 
 

20th-century German mathematicians
University of Bonn alumni
1962 births
Living people
Differential geometers
Mathematical physicists
People from Kaiserslautern
21st-century German mathematicians
Presidents of the German Mathematical Society